Li Bin (Chinese: 李彬; Pinyin: Lǐ Bīn; born 21 March 1991) is a Chinese footballer who currently plays for Shenzhen Ledman in the China League Two.

Club career
Li Bin was promoted to Chinese Super League side Guangzhou Pharmaceutical's first squad in 2009 but didn't have a chance to appear in the league game. In February 2010, Guangzhou was relegated to China League One in the fallout of a match-fixing scandal. Li returned to Guangzhou's youth team when the club was renamed as Guangzhou Evergrande in March 2010. He played for Guangzhou Youth and made seventeen appearances in the 2011 third tier season. Li was promoted to reserves squad by Italian manager Marcello Lippi in July 2012. In 2013, Li was included in Guangzhou Evergrande's first team and was given the number 26 shirt, which was last worn by Wu Pingfeng.

In March 2014，Li moved to China League Two side Yinchuan Helanshan.
In March 2018, Li transferred to League Two side Shenzhen Ledman.

Career statistics 
Statistics accurate as of match played 13 October 2018.

Honours

Club
Guangzhou Evergrande
Chinese Super League: 2013
AFC Champions League: 2013

References

1991 births
Living people
Chinese footballers
Footballers from Tianjin
Guangzhou F.C. players
Association football midfielders
21st-century Chinese people